Bartolomeo Schedoni (sometimes Schedone) (1578 – 23 December 1615) was an Italian early Baroque painter from Modena.

Biography
He was born in Modena, and moved to Parma with his father, a mask-maker who served the Farnese court. In 1595 Schedoni traveled to Rome, where he apprenticed briefly under Federico Zuccari with the sponsorship of Ranuccio I Farnese, Duke of Parma. After falling ill, he returned to Parma. The baroque art historian Count Carlo Cesare Malvasia (1616–1693) claims that Schedoni trained under Annibale Carracci in Bologna, although this is questionable; his early work reveals instead his study of Correggio's works in Parma.

Schedoni's earliest known commission was in 1598. He left Parma after an imprisonment for assault, and relocated to Modena. There he served as painter to the court of Cesare d’Este, and collaborated with Ercole dell'Abate in decorating the ceiling of the Sala del Consiglio Vecchio of the Palazzo Comunale. After an interruption caused by Schedoni's imprisonment for another altercation, this work was completed in July 1607.

After December 1607, he worked in Parma for the court of Ranuccio I. The duke greatly esteemed Schedoni, and gave him a farm at  when Schedoni married in 1611. Schedoni's works included small devotional images and the large altarpiece Holy Family in Glory Worshipped by SS John the Baptist, Francis of Assisi, Lawrence and Peregrinus.

Schedoni died on 23 December 1615. According to the Modenese chronicler Giovanni Battista Spaccini, he died in a "fit of passion"—possibly a suicide—after a night of heavy gambling losses.

Style

Schedoni's paintings often depict brilliantly lit figures set against a dark background. Great emphasis is given to the angular patterns of brightly colored drapery, which, according to the art historian Lawrence Gowing, "almost obscure the narrative content of the scene and instead disseminate a pervading sense of emotional emergency."

Schedoni's late manner shows the influence of Ludovico Carracci. Another important influence on Schedoni's style and subjects was Caravaggio, whose Entombment of Christ (1603–04) provided the prototype for Schedoni's Deposition (c. 1613) in the Galleria Nazionale of Parma. The Parmesan painter Giovanni Lanfranco was among those who found inspiration in Schedoni's theatrical style.

Schedoni's masterpieces are in the Galleria Nazionale of Parma, and were the two paintings intended for the altar of the church of the Capuchin convent in Fontevivo, near Parma.

Selected works
Deposition  (c. 1610), Louvre
Charity (1611)
Deposition (1613), Galleria Nazionale of Parma
Saint Elizabeth Giving Alms to the Poor (1613, painted for the Ducal Palace in Parma, before being moved to Naples with the Farnese Collection in 1734 upon being inherited by Charles of Bourbon, then to Rome by the French from 1799 to 1832, before being returned to Naples, initially to the Museo Borbonico then in 1841 to the Royal Palace)
Three Marys at the Tomb (c. 1613–14)
Rest on the Flight to Egypt

References

Sources
 
 M. Horak and F. Obertelli, Opere di Bartolomeo Schedoni nel piacentino, in "Panorama Musei", anno XXI, n. 1, aprile 2016

External links
 

16th-century Italian painters
Italian male painters
17th-century Italian painters
Painters from Parma
Italian Baroque painters
Painters from Modena
1578 births
1615 deaths
Caravaggisti